Sameera is a 1981 Indian Hindi-language film directed by Vinay Shukla, starring Mithun Chakraborty, Shabana Azmi and Parikshat Sahni.

Cast
 Mithun Chakraborty 
 Shabana Azmi
 Parikshit Sahni

Songs
The songs are composed by Jaidev, released under the name "Wohi Baat", the previous title of the film.

External links
 

1981 films
1980s Hindi-language films
Films scored by Rajesh Roshan